Aprominta africana is a moth in the family Autostichidae. It was described by László Anthony Gozmány in 1961. It is found in Morocco.

References

Moths described in 1961
Aprominta
Moths of Africa